The Elissonas or Helisson is a small river that flows entirely in the Sikyona municipality, in Corinthia, in the northeastern Peloponnese in Greece. The river begins near the village of Gonoussa and empties into the Gulf of Corinth near the centre of Kiato. The ancient city Sicyon was situated on a plateau between the rivers Asopus to the east and Helisson to the west.

See also
List of rivers in Greece

References

Landforms of Corinthia
Rivers of Greece
Rivers of Peloponnese (region)
Drainage basins of the Gulf of Corinth